Escapade is a 1957 French adventure film directed by Ralph Habib and starring Louis Jourdan, Dany Carrel, and Roger Hanin.

Premise
Some gangsters use a young girl to get to a recently released convict who hid $10 million from a robbery just before he was caught.

Cast

 Louis Jourdan : Frank Raphaël
 Dany Carrel : Agnès Mercenay
 Roger Hanin : Olivier
 Lise Delamare : Miss  Mercenay
 Jean-Loup Philippe :  Philippe
 Félix Martin : Angelo
 Arlette Merry : Dolly
 Marcel Bozzuffi : Raymond
 Guy Tréjan :  Maurice
  : sister of Agnè 
 Albert Rémy : José  
 Jean Daurand : inspector
 José Lewgoy : Caraco

External links 
 Escapade at Louisjourdan.net
 

French adventure films
1957 adventure films
1957 films
Films directed by Ralph Habib
Films based on short fiction
Films based on works by Cornell Woolrich
French black-and-white films
1950s French-language films
1950s French films